Talaus elegans is a species of crab spiders in the family Thomisidae. It is found in Sumatra.

References

External links
 Talaus elegans at the World Spider Catalog

Thomisidae
Spiders described in 1890
Spiders of Indonesia
Fauna of Sumatra